Ihi is the goddess of wisdom and learning in Tahitian mythology. She is the daughter of the god Taaroa.

References 
 Robert D. Craig: Dictionary of Polynesian Mythology, 1989

Tahiti and Society Islands goddesses
Wisdom goddesses